Maeil Broadcasting Network, Inc. (MBN) (주식회사 매일방송) is a South Korean cable TV network operated by the Maeil Business Newspaper.

History
Initially founded on September 23, 1993, as Maeil Business TV, the station's name was later changed to Maeil Broadcasting Network in March 2011. The station was operated as a news channel until December 1, 2011, at which point it transitioned into a generalist cable TV channel, launching MBN general programming alongside JTBC, Channel A, and TV Chosun.

Chronology

1990s
On September 23, 1993 the company was founded under the name Maeil Business TV. It launched the cable industry's first successful satellite transmission on December 6, 1994. On March 1, 1995, it began broadcasting for 15 hours per day, and on January 1, 1996, it began broadcasting 24 hours per day.

2000s
November 13, 2000, marked the day of the network's first digital broadcast. 
Daily Stock TV (MBNs) securities in the MK TV (MKS) changed the channel name to its current SBS CNBC. Satellite TV channel providers were selected on June 4, 2001. On December 28, 2001, MK Securities TV (MKS) provisionally suspended broadcasting. The network came to an agreement with  Korea Digital Satellite Broadcasting (now the KT Sky Life) and signed a program supply agreement on September 27, 2001.
 2002 April 30: USA CNBC and the business cooperation contract, plus MBN - CNBC to the channel name and logo Change
 2005 July 1: MBN CNBC channel name is changed to the reduction in the MBN
In July 2008, a state-of-the-art digital news production system began operation with the opening of a new news studio. On October 5, 2009, MBN began broadcasting in HD and began transmission from Sky Life to Cable TV on October 12.

2010s
In March 2011 the network was renamed the Maeil Broadcasting Network Ltd. The MBN DMB radio stations were shut down in September 2011.

Programming

Dramas
 Bolder By the Day (December 3, 2011 — April 1, 2012)
 What's Up (December 3, 2011 – February 5, 2012)
 Come, Come, Absolutely Come (December 5, 2011 — March 2, 2012)
 Vampire Idol (December 5, 2011 – March 30, 2012)
 Knock (August 10, 2012)
 It's Okay Because I Am A Mom (September 28—29, 2015)
 Tears of Heaven (October 11, 2014 – January 3, 2015)
 Yeonnam-dong 539 (January 10 – March 28, 2018)
 High-End Crush (November 14, 2015 – January 17, 2016)
 Rich Man (May 14 – June 28, 2018, with Dramax)
 Witch's Love (July 25 – August 30, 2018)
 Devilish Charm (September 5 – October 25, 2018, with Dramax)
 Love Alert (October 31 – December 20, 2018, with Dramax)
 Best Chicken (January 2 – February 7, 2019, with Dramax)
 Loss Time Life (February 13 – 14, 2019)
 Level Up (July 10 – August 15, 2019, with Dramax)
 Graceful Family (August 21 – October 17, 2019, with Dramax)
 My Dangerous Wife (October 5, 2020)
 Bossam: Steal the Fate (May 1, 2021)

News
 MBN News 7

Variety
 Naturally (2019 – 2020)
 Miss Back (2020 – 2021)
 National Bang Bang Cook Cook (2021present)
 The Origin – A, B, Or What? (2022)
 Burning Trotman (2022 – present)

Logos

See also
 JTBC
 TV Chosun
 TVN

Footnotes

External links
 MBN Homepage
 MBN Facebook

Korean-language television stations
Television channels and stations established in 1995
Television channels in South Korea